The Fatal Conceit: The Errors of Socialism is a book written by the economist and political philosopher Friedrich Hayek and edited by the philosopher William Warren Bartley. The book was first published in 1988 by the University of Chicago Press. Questions have been raised about how far Bartley was the editor and how far the author.

The title of the book derives from a passage in Adam Smith's The Theory of Moral Sentiments (1759), though the exact phrase does not occur in Smith's book.

Summary
In this book, Hayek aims to refute socialism by demonstrating that socialist theories are not only logically incorrect but that their premises are also incorrect. According to Hayek, civilizations grew because societal traditions placed importance on private property, leading to expansion, trade, and eventually the modern capitalist system, which he calls the extended order. Hayek says this demonstrates a key flaw within socialist thought, which holds only purposefully designed changes can be the most efficient. Also, he says statist (e.g., "socialist") economies cannot be efficient because dispersed knowledge is required in a modern economy. Additionally, Hayek asserts that since modern civilization, and all of its customs and traditions, naturally led to the current order and are needed for its continuance, fundamental changes to the system that try to control it are doomed to fail since they are impossible or unsustainable in modern civilization. Price signals are the only means of enabling each economic decision maker to communicate tacit knowledge or dispersed knowledge with each other to solve the economic calculation problem.

Controversy
There is scholarly debate on the extent of William Warren Bartley's influence on the work. Officially, Bartley was the editor who prepared the book for publication once Hayek fell ill in 1985. However, the inclusion of material from Bartley's philosophical point of view and citations that other people provided to Bartley have led to questions about how much of the book was written by Hayek and whether Hayek knew about the added material. Bruce Caldwell thinks the evidence "clearly points towards a conclusion that the book was a product more of [Bartley's] pen than of Hayek's. ... Bartley may have written the book".

Quotations

The curious task of economics is to demonstrate to men how little they really know about what they imagine they can design.

See also

 Dispersed knowledge
 Fallibilism
 Invisible hand
 Opportunity cost
 Tax choice
 "The Use of Knowledge in Society", essay by Hayek

References

1988 non-fiction books
Books about socialism
Books by Friedrich Hayek
English-language books
University of Chicago Press books